The women's 3000 metres race of the 2013–14 ISU Speed Skating World Cup 1, arranged in the Olympic Oval, in Calgary, Alberta, Canada, was held on 8 November 2013.

Claudia Pechstein of Germany won, while Martina Sáblíková of the Czech Republic came second, and Ireen Wüst of the Netherlands came third. Antoinette de Jong of the Netherlands set a new world record for juniors with a time of 4:00.46. Luiza Złotkowska of Poland won Division B.

Results
The race took place on Friday, 8 November, with Division A scheduled in the morning session, at 12:09, and Division B scheduled in the afternoon session, at 17:51.

Division A

Division B

References

Women 3000
1